The Yamuna is the second-largest tributary river of the Ganges by discharge and the longest tributary in India. It merges with the Ganges at Triveni Sangam, Allahabad, which is a site of the Kumbh Mela, a Hindu festival held every 12 years.

Like the Ganges, the Yamuna is highly venerated in Hinduism and worshipped as the goddess Yamuna. She is the daughter of the sun god, Surya, and the sister of Yama, the god of death, and so she is also known as Yami. According to popular Hindu legends, bathing in Yamuna's sacred waters frees one from the torments of death.

The river crosses several states such as Haryana, Uttar Pradesh, Uttarakhand and Delhi. It also meets several tributaries along the way, including Tons, Chambal, its longest tributary which has its own large basin, followed by Sindh, the Betwa, and Ken. From Uttarakhand, the river flows into the state of Himachal Pradesh. After passing Paonta Sahib, Yamuna flows along the boundary of Haryana and Uttar Pradesh and after exiting Haryana it continues to flow till it merges with the river Ganges at Sangam or Prayag in Allahbad (Uttar Pradesh). It helps create the highly fertile alluvial Ganges-Yamuna Doab region between itself and the Ganges in the Indo-Gangetic plain.

Nearly 57 million people depend on the Yamuna's waters, and the river accounts for more than 70 percent of Delhi's water supply. It has an annual flow of 97 billion cubic metres, and nearly 4 billion cubic metres are consumed every year (of which irrigation constitutes 96%). At the Hathni Kund Barrage, its waters are diverted into two large canals: the Western Yamuna Canal flowing towards Haryana and the Eastern Yamuna Canal towards Uttar Pradesh. Beyond that point the Yamuna is joined by the Somb, a seasonal rivulet from Haryana, and by the highly polluted Hindon River near Noida, by Najafgarh drain near Wazirabad and by various other drains, so that it continues only as a trickling sewage-bearing drain before joining the Chambal at Pachnada in the Etawah District of Uttar Pradesh. 

Below this, the discharge of wastewater in Delhi through 15 drains between Wazirabad barrage and Okhla barrage renders the river severely polluted. Wazirabad barrage to Okhla Barrage,  stretch of Yamuna in Delhi, is less than 2% of Yamuna's total length but accounts for nearly 80% of the total pollution in the river. Untreated wastewater and poor quality of water discharged from the wastewater treatment plants are the major reasons of Yamuna's pollution in Delhi. To address river pollution, measures have been taken by the Ministry of Environment and Forests (MoEF) under the Yamuna Action Plan (YAP) which has been implemented since 1993 by the MoEF's National River Conservation Directorate (NRCD).

Basin

Palaeochannels: Sarasvati's tributary

The present Sarsuti river which originates in the Shivalik hills in Himachal and Haryana border and merges with Ghaggar River near Pehowa is the palaeochannel of Yamuna. Yamuna changed its course to the east due to a shift in the slope of the earth's crust caused by plate tectonics.

Sources: Banderpoonch peak and Yamunotri glacier

Yamunotri temple, a shrine dedicated to the goddess Yamuna, is one of the holiest shrines in Hinduism, and part of the Chota Char Dham Yatra circuit. Also standing close to the temple, on its  trek route that follows the right bank of the river, lies Markendeya Tirtha, where the sage Markandeya wrote the Markandeya Purana.

Current channel 

Morainic deposits are found along the steep Upper Yamuna, highlighted with geomorphic features such as interlocking spurs, steep rock benches, gorges and stream terraces. Large terraces formed over a long period of time can be seen in the lower course of the river, such as those near Naugoan. An important part of its early catchment area, totalling , lies in Himachal Pradesh. The Tons, Yamuna's largest tributary, drains a large portion of the upper catchment area and holds more water than the main stream. It rises from the Hari-ki-dun valley and merges after Kalsi near Dehradun. The drainage system of the river stretches between Giri-Sutlej catchment in Himachal and Yamuna-Bhilangna catchment in Garhwal, also draining the ridge of Shimla. Kalanag is the highest point of the Yamuna basin. Other tributaries in the region are the Giri, Rishi Ganga Kunta, Hanuman Ganga and Bata, which drain the upper catchment area of the Yamuna basin.

From the upper catchment area, the river descends onto the plains of Doon Valley, at Dak Pathar near Dehradun. Flowing through the Dakpathar Barrage, the water is diverted into a canal for power generation. Further downstream, the Assan River joins the Yamuna at the Asan Barrage, which hosts a bird sanctuary. After passing the Sikh pilgrimage town of Paonta Sahib, the Yamuna reaches Tajewala in Yamuna Nagar district (named after the river) of Haryana. A dam built here in 1873 is the origin of two important canals, the Western and Eastern Yamuna Canals, which irrigate the states of Haryana and Uttar Pradesh. The Western Yamuna Canal (WYC) crosses Yamuna Nagar, Karnal, Panipat and Sonipat before reaching the Haiderpur treatment plant, which contributes to Delhi's municipal water supply. The Yamuna receives wastewater from Yamuna Nagar and Panipat cities; beyond this it is replenished by seasonal streams and groundwater accrual. During the dry season, the Yamuna remains dry in many stretches between the Tajewala dam and Delhi, where it enters near the Palla barrage after traversing .

The Yamuna defines the state borders between Himachal Pradesh and Uttarakhand, and between Haryana, Delhi and Uttar Pradesh. When the Yamuna reaches the Indo-Gangetic plain, it runs almost parallel to the Ganges, the two rivers creating the Ganges-Yamuna Doab region. Spread across , one-third of the alluvial plain, the region is known for its agricultural output, particularly for the cultivation of basmati rice. The plain's agriculture supports one-third of India's population.

Subsequently, the Yamuna flows through the states of Delhi, Haryana and Uttar Pradesh] before merging with the Ganges at a sacred spot known as Triveni Sangam in Allahabad. Pilgrims travel by boats to platforms erected in midstream to offer prayers. During the Kumbh Mela, held every 12 years, large congregations of people immerse themselves in the sacred waters of the confluence. The cities of Baghpat, Delhi, Noida, Mathura, Agra, Firozabad, Etawah, Kalpi, Hamirpur, and Allahabad lie on its banks. At Etawah, it meets it another important tributary, Chambal, followed by a host of tributaries further down, including, Sindh, the Betwa, and Ken.

Important tributaries

Along its  length, the Yamuna has many notable tributaries:

 Tons River, Yamuna's largest tributary, which rises in the  Bandarpoonch mountain, and has a large basin in Himachal Pradesh. It meets Yamuna below Kalsi near Dehradun, Uttarakhand.
 Hindon River, which originates in the Saharanpur District, from Upper Shivalik in the Lower Himalayan Range.
 Ken River, which flows through the Bundelkhand region of Madhya Pradesh and Uttar Pradesh. It originates near Ahirgawan village in Jabalpur district and travels a distance of  before merging with the Yamuna at Chilla village, near Fatehpur in Uttar Pradesh.
 Chambal River, known as Charmanvati in ancient texts, which is Yamuna's longest tributary.
 Sindh River, which joins the Yamuna shortly after the Chambal.
 Sasur Khaderi River,  Sasur Khaderi, which is a tributary in Fatehpur district.
 Betwa River, or Betravati rises from Vindhya range and flows to North-East via Madhya Pradesh and Uttar Pradesh. The confluence of both rivers (Yamuna and Betwa) is Hamirpur district, Uttar Pradesh. One of the Indian Navy frigates INS BETWA is named in honour of the river Betwa.

Background

Etymology

The name Yamuna seems to be derived from the Sanskrit word "yama", meaning 'twin', and it may have been applied to the river because it runs parallel to the Ganges.

History

The earliest mention of Yamuna is found at many places in the Rig Veda (c. 1500–1000 BCE), which was composed during the Vedic period  BCE, and also in the later Atharvaveda, and the Brahmanas including Aitareya Brahmana and Shatapatha Brahmana. In the Rigveda, the story of the Yamuna describes her "excessive love" for her twin, Yama, who in turn asks her to find a suitable match for herself, which she does in Krishna.

Yamuna is mentioned as Iomanes (Ioames) in the surveys of Seleucus I Nicator, an officer of Alexander the Great and one of the Diadochi, who visited India in 305 BCE. Greek traveller and geographer Megasthenes visited India sometime before 288 BCE (the date of Chandragupta's death) and mentioned the river in his Indica, where he described the region around it as the land of Surasena. In Mahabharata, the Pandava capital of Indraprastha was situated on the banks of Yamuna, considered to be the site of modern Delhi.

Geological evidence indicates that in the distant past the Yamuna was a tributary of the Ghaggar River (identified by some as the Vedic Sarasvati River). It later changed its course eastward, becoming a tributary of the Ganges. While some have argued that this was due to a tectonic event, and may have led to the Sarasvati River drying up, the end of many Harappan civilisation settlements, and creation of the Thar desert, recent geological research suggests that the diversion of the Yamuna to the Ganges may have occurred during the Pleistocene, and thus could not be connected to the decline of the Harappan civilisation in the region.

Most of the great empires which ruled over a majority of India were based in the highly fertile Ganges–Yamuna basin, including the Magadha, Maurya Empire (321–185 BCE), Shunga Empire (185–73 BCE), Kushan Empire (1st–3rd centuries CE), and Gupta Empire (280–550 CE), and many had their capitals here, in cities like Pataliputra or Mathura. These rivers were revered throughout these kingdoms that flourished on their banks; since the period of Chandragupta II ( 375–415 CE), statues both the Ganges and Yamuna became common throughout the Gupta Empire. Further to the South, images of the Ganges and Yamuna are found amidst shrines of the Chalukyas, Rashtrakutas (753–982), and on their royal seals; prior to them, the Chola Empire also added the river into their architectural motifs. The Three River Goddess shrine, next to the Kailash rock-cut Temple at Ellora, shows the Ganges flanked by the Yamuna and Saraswati.

Use of water

1994 water sharing agreement 

The stretch of the river from its origin at Yamunotri to Okhla barrage in Delhi is called "Upper Yamuna". A Memorandum of Understanding (MoU) was signed amongst the five basin states (Himachal Pradesh, Uttar Pradesh, Uttarakhand, Haryana, Rajasthan, and Delhi) on 12 May 1994 for sharing of its waters. This led to the formation of Upper Yamuna River Board under India's Ministry of Water Resources, whose primary functions are: regulation of the available flows amongst the beneficiary states and monitoring the return flows; monitoring conservation and upgrading the quality of surface and groundwater; maintaining hydro-meteorological data for the basin; overviewing plans for watershed management; and monitoring and reviewing the progress of all projects up to and including Okhla barrage.

Flood forecasting systems are established at Poanta Sahib, where Tons, Pawar and Giri tributaries meet. The river take 60 hours to travel from Tajewala to Delhi, thus allowing a two-day advance flood warning period. The Central Water Commission started flood-forecasting services in 1958 with its first forecasting station on Yamuna at Delhi Railway Bridge.

Barrages

Yamuna has the following six functional barrages (eight including old replaced barrages, nine including a new proposed barrage), from north-west to southeast:

 Dakpathar Barrage in Uttarakhand, managed by the Uttarakhand government.
 Hathni Kund Barrage in Haryana,  from the source of Yamuna, built in 1999 and managed by Haryana government.
 Tajewala Barrage was built in 1873 and replaced by the Hathni Kund.
 Wazirabad barrage in north Delhi,  from Hathni Kund barrage, managed by the Delhi government.
 ITO barrage (Indraparstha barrage) in central Delhi, managed by the Haryana govt.
 New Okhla Barrage, a new barrage, managed by the UP government.
 Palla barrage downstream on "Delhi-Faridabad canal" in Haryana, managed by the Haryana government.
 Gokul barrage (a.k.a. Mathura barrage) is at Gokul in Uttar Pradesh, managed by the UP government.

Irrigation

Use of the Yamuna's waters for irrigation in the Indo-Gangetic Plains is enhanced by its many canals, some dating to the 14th century Tughlaq dynasty, which built the Nahr-i-Bahisht (Paradise) parallel to the river. The Nahr-i-Bahisht was restored and extended by the Mughals in the first half of the 17th century, by engineer Ali Mardan Khan, starting from Benawas where the river enters the plains and terminating near the Mughal capital of Shahjahanabad, the present city of Delhi.

Eastern Yamuna Canal

Western Yamuna Canal

The Western Yamuna Canal (WYC) was built in 1335 CE by Firuz Shah Tughlaq. Excessive silting caused it to stop flowing , when the British Raj undertook a three-year renovation in 1817 by Bengal Engineer Group. The Tajewala Barrage dam was built in 1832–33 to regulate the flow of water, and was replaced by the modern Hathni Kund Barrage in 1999.

The canals irrigate vast tracts of land in the region in Ambala, Karnal, Sonipat, Rohtak, Jind, Hisar and Bhiwani districts.

The major branch canals are:

During the dry summer season, the stretch above Agra resembles a minor stream.
 Munak canal, built in 1819 and renovated in 2008, originates at Munak in Karnal district and extends 22 km to Delhi, carrying  of water.
 Delhi Branch
 Bhalaut Branch, originating at Khubru village, flows through Jhajjar district.
 Jhajjar Branch, flows through Jhajjar district.
 Sirsa Branch, the largest branch of the WYC, constructed in 1889–1895. It originates at Indri and meanders through Jind district, Fatehabad district and Sirsa district.
 Jind Branch
 Bhiwani Branch, which meanders through Bhiwani district and passes Bidhwan.
 Barwala Branch
 Hansi Branch, built in 1825 and remodelled in 1959. It originates at Munak and meanders through Hansi tehsil of Hisar district.
 Butana Branch
 Sunder Branch, which passes Kanwari in Hisar district.
 Rohtak Branch

Sutlej–Yamuna Link Canal 

A proposed heavy freight canal, the Sutlej–Yamuna Link (SYL), is being built westwards from near the Yamuna's headwaters through the Punjab region near an ancient caravan route and highlands pass to the navigable parts of the Sutlej–Indus watershed. This will connect the Ganges, which flows to the east coast of the subcontinent, with points west (via Pakistan). When completed, the SYL will allow shipping from India's east coast to the west coast and the Arabian sea, shortening important commercial links for north-central India's large population.

National Waterway 

Yamuna is one of the National Waterways of India, designated as NW110 in Haryana, Delhi and Uttar Pradesh. Some of its sections are being developed for navigation:

 Delhi–Faridabad (Wazirabad barrage to Palla barrage, via ITO barrage), is being developed for passenger and cargo ferry service.
 Delhi–Agra (Okhla barrage to Agra Canal), is planned for steamer service by the end of June 2017 with the help of the Netherlands.

Religious significance

Purifying waters 

Like the Ganges, the Yamuna River is highly venerated in Hinduism in the form of a river and as the goddess Yamuna. The Yamuna is considered a river of heaven. The Rig Veda includes the Yamuna River as one of the seven sacred rivers, along with the Ganges. According to Hindu mythology, the River was brought to Earth by the ascetic practice of the Seven Sages where she first descended on Mount Kalinda. Therefore, Yamuna is also known as Kalindi.

The Padma Purana describes Yamuna's purifying properties and states that her waters cleanse the mind from sin. It also mentions that bathing in her sacred waters frees one from the torments of death. Art from the Gupta period depict Yamuna and Ganga on the entrances and doorjambs of temples and sacred places. Upon passing through these doors, visitors were symbolically purified by these rivers.

Goddess personified 
In her human form, Yamuna is the daughter of Surya, the sun god, and his wife Saranyu. She is the twin sister of Yama, the god of death, and is also known as Yami. The Agni Purana describes Yamuna as having a dark complexion, mounted on a turtle, and holding a pot in her hand.

Devotion 
Yamuna, as a river and goddess, has a close association with Krishna. The Puranas narrate many stories about Krishna in relation to the river and its surroundings. One such story is of Kaliya Daman, the subduing of Kaliya, a Nāga which had inhabited the river and terrorised the people of Braja. Due to Krishna's connection with the River and the Braja region, the Yamuna River is a center of pilgrimage for his devotees. In the Pushti Marga, founded by Vallabhacharya and in which Krishna is the main deity, Yamuna is worshipped as a goddess.

The Yamunashtakam is a 16th century Sanskrit hymn composed by Vallabhacharya which describes the story of Yamuna's descent to meet her beloved Krishna and to purify the world. The hymn also praises her for being the source of all spiritual abilities. And while the Ganges is considered an epitome of asceticism and higher knowledge and can grant Moksha or liberation, it is Yamuna, who, being a holder of infinite love and compassion, can grant freedom, even from death, the realm of her elder brother. Vallabhacharya writes that she rushes down the Kalinda Mountain, and describes her as the daughter of Kalinda, giving her the name Kalindi, the backdrop of Krishna Leela. The text also talks about her water being the colour of Lord Krishna, which is dark (Shyam). The river is referred to as Asita in some historical texts.

Shlokas on Yamuna

Numerous Hindu texts have shlokas (hymns) on Yamuna as follows:
 "Yamunashtakam" by Mahaprabhu Vallabhacharya.
 "Simply by bathing in the Yamuna, anyone can diminish the reactions of his sinful activities." (Krishna Book, Chap 38)
 "By taking bath in the Yamuna River people are liberated and become Krishna conscious." (Chaitanya Charitamrita Antya 4.98 purport)
 "There are many devotees in Vrindavana who regularly bathe in the Yamuna, and this cleanses all the contamination of the material world." (Srimad Bhagavatam 5.8.31)
 "One should not give up the process of austerity. If possible, one should bathe in the water of the Yamuna. This is an item of austerity. Therefore, our Krishna consciousness movement has established a center in Vrindavana so that one may bathe in the Yamuna, chant the Hare Krishna mantra and then become perfect and return back to Godhead." (Srimad Bhagavatam 6.5.28 purport)
 "The Yamuna River washed Krishna's lotus feet when the Lord appeared in Vrindavana five thousand years ago. Lord Krishna sported daily with His boys and girlfriends in the Yamuna River and consequently, that river is also caranamrita." (Srimad Bhagavatam 11.6.19)
 "According to the Varaha Purana as quoted by Srila Jiva Gosvami, there is no difference between the water of the Ganges and the Yamuna, but when the water of the Ganges is sanctified one hundred times, it is called the Yamuna. Similarly, it is said in the scriptures that one thousand names of Vishnu are equal to one name of Rama and three names of Lord Rama are equal to one name of Krishna." (Srimad Bhagavatam 1.19.6 purport)

Ecology

Fauna

The Yamuna from the source to its culmination in Ganges is a habitat for fish for approximately  stretch and supports a rich diversity of species. Fish from the family Cyprinidae dominate the variety of fish species found in the river. This includes Indian carp and also invasive species from the family. In a study, 93 species of fish were found in the river including catfish. Species of non-native Tilapia have become established in the river. They have been implicated in the decline of the Ghariyal (Indian crocodile) population in the river. Large turtles used to be a common sight on the river a few decades ago but they have mostly disappeared.

Pollution

In 1909, the waters of the Yamuna were distinguishable as clear blue, when compared to the silt-laden yellow of the Ganges. However, due to high-density population growth and fast industrialisation, Yamuna has become one of the most polluted rivers in the world. The Yamuna is particularly polluted downstream of New Delhi, the capital of India, which dumps about 58% of its waste into the river. A 2016 study shows that there is 100% urban metabolism of River Yamuna as it passes through the National Capital Territory (NCT) of Delhi. The most pollution comes from Wazirabad, from where Yamuna enters Delhi.

Causes

Wazirabad barrage to New Okhla Barrage, "22 km stretch of Yamuna in Delhi, is less than 2% of Yamuna's total length but accounts for nearly 80% of the total pollution in the river", 22 out of 35 sewage treatment plants in Delhi do not meet the wastewater standards prescribed by the Delhi Pollution Control Committee (DPCC), thus untreated wastewater and poor quality of water discharged from the wastewater treatment plants are the major reasons. As of 2019, the river receives 800 million litres of largely untreated sewage and additional 44 million litres of industrial effluents each day, of which only 35 percent of the sewage released into the river are believed to be treated. In 1994, the states of Uttarakhand, Himachal Pradesh, Uttar Pradesh, Haryana, Rajasthan and Delhi made a water sharing agreement that is due for revision in 2025. To achieve a water quality suitable for bathing (BOD<3 mg/L and DO>5 mg/L) would require a greater rate of water flow in the river.

The last barrage across the Yamuna river is the Mathura barrage at Gokul to supply its drinking water. Downstream of this barrage, many pumping stations are constructed to feed the river water for irrigation needs. These pumping stations are near Pateora Danda , Samgara , Ainjhi , Bilas Khadar , and Samari . Depletion of the base flows available in the river during the non-monsoon months by these pump houses is exacerbating river pollution from Mathura to Allahabad in the absence of adequate fresh water to dilute the polluted drainage from habitations and industries.

Cleanup efforts 
To address river pollution, measures have been taken by the Ministry of Environment and Forests (MoEF) in 12 towns of Haryana, 8 towns of Uttar Pradesh, and Delhi, under the Yamuna Action Plan (YAP) which has been implemented since 1993 by the MoEF's National River Conservation Directorate (NRCD). The Japan Bank for International Cooperation is participating in the YAP in 15 of the towns (excluding 6 towns of Haryana included later on the direction of the Supreme Court of India) with soft loan assistance of 17.773 billion Japanese yen (equivalent to about 700 crore [7 billion rupees]) while the government of India is providing the funds for the remaining 6 towns. In 2007, the Indian government's plans to repair sewage lines were predicted to improve the water quality of the river 90% by 2010.

Under the YAP- III scheme, a new sewage treatment plant is being built at the largest such facility in India by the Delhi Jal Board (DJB).

In August 2009, the Delhi Jal Board (DJB) initiated its plan for resuscitating the Yamuna's  stretch in Delhi by constructing interceptor sewers, at the cost of about 1,800 crore (18 billion rupees).

On 25 April 2014, the National Green Tribunal Act (NGA) recommended the government to declare a  stretch of the Yamuna in Delhi and Uttar Pradesh as a conservation zone. A report prepared by the Ministry of Environment and Forests (MoEF) panel was submitted to the NGA on the same day.

The High Court in the northern Indian state of Uttarakhand ordered in March 2017 that the Ganges and its main tributary, the Yamuna, be assigned the status of legal entities, making the rivers "legal and living entities having the status of a legal person with all corresponding rights, duties and liabilities". This decision meant that polluting or damaging the rivers is equivalent to harming a person. The court cited the example of the New Zealand Whanganui River, which was also declared to possess full rights of a legal person.

Gallery

See also

 Environmental personhood
 List of rivers of India
 Western Jamuna Canal Link
 Yamuna in Hinduism
 Yamuna Pushkaram
 Yamuna Pushta

References

Further reading

External links

 The Geography of the Rigveda 
 Yamuna Action Plan
 . The Guardian (7 July 2017)
 Yamuna Mission

 
Rigvedic rivers
Rivers of Delhi
Rivers of Haryana
Rivers of Uttar Pradesh
Rivers of Uttarakhand
Sacred rivers
Sea and river goddesses
Tributaries of the Ganges
Sarasvati River
Rivers in Buddhism
Rivers of India
Environmental personhood